Friðrik Guðmundsson (9 November 1925 – 16 April 2002) was an Icelandic athlete. He competed in the men's discus throw at the 1952 Summer Olympics.

References

1925 births
2002 deaths
Athletes (track and field) at the 1952 Summer Olympics
Friðrik Guðmundsson
Friðrik Guðmundsson
Place of birth missing